In statistics, a variational series is a non-decreasing sequence composed from an initial series of independent and identically distributed random variables . The members of the variational series form order statistics, which form the basis for nonparametric statistical methods.

References

Nonparametric statistics